Landon Deireragea (born 16 May 1960) is a Nauruan politician.

Parliamentary role

Deireragea has been elected to parliament in the 2008 general elections, gaining the seat of Cyril Buraman.

He represents the Anetan Constituency in the Parliament of Nauru.

Deireragea was defeated in the 2013 parliamentary elections, with Cyril Buraman taking the seat.

Deputy Speaker

After the June 2010 general elections Deireragea was elected Deputy Speaker of Parliament. In this role he deputizes for the Speaker of Parliament. Thus far in his term the office of speaker has fallen vacant twice, during which time Deireragea became Acting Speaker. The first period was the longest, July 9 until November 1, 2010. This period of vacancy was caused by the removal of Aloysius Amwano from office and was drawn out by deadlock over who should be speaker. Finally Ludwig Scotty was elected, ending Deireragea's acting speakership. The second period was brief, from April 18 until April 25, 2013, between the resignation of Speaker Scotty and the election of Godfrey Thoma.

Background

Deireragea is a close relative of former parliamentarians Maein Deireragea and James Deireragea, who both served in the parliament for the Anabar Constituency. Politics in Nauru tends to be family oriented.

See also

 Politics of Nauru
 Elections in Nauru
 2008 Nauruan parliamentary election

References

Members of the Parliament of Nauru
Speakers of the Parliament of Nauru
1960 births
Living people
People from Anetan District
21st-century Nauruan politicians